Taophila is a genus of leaf beetles in the subfamily Eumolpinae. The genus is endemic to New Caledonia.

Taxonomy
Taophila was first established in 1916 by the Austrian entomologist Karl Borromaeus Maria Josef Heller for a single described species, Taophila subsericea. The genus remained monotypic for nearly a century, until two further species were described in 2007. In 2010, the genus was revised by G. Allan Samuelson, who added another nine species.

In 2014, entomologists Jésus Gómez-Zurita and Anabela Cardoso made a morphological and molecular phylogenetic study of the genus, using the results to propose two new subgenera: Jolivetiana and Lapita. The subgenus Lapita was later found to be a junior homonym of the fly genus Lapita Bickel, 2002, and moreover the group has many morphological differences to Taophila s. str., so it was renamed to Tricholapita and elevated in rank to genus in 2020.

Species
Taophila contains 21 species, which are divided into two subgenera:
 Subgenus Taophila Heller, 1916
 Taophila bituberculata Platania & Gómez-Zurita, 2021
 Taophila carinata Platania & Gómez-Zurita, 2021
 Taophila corvi Samuelson, 2010
 Taophila dapportoi Platania & Gómez-Zurita, 2021
 Taophila davincii Platania & Gómez-Zurita, 2021
 Taophila deimos Samuelson, 2010
 Taophila draco Platania & Gómez-Zurita, 2021
 Taophila goa Platania & Gómez-Zurita, 2021
 Taophila hackae Platania & Gómez-Zurita, 2021
 Taophila hydrae Samuelson, 2010
 Taophila joliveti Samuelson, 2010
 Taophila millei Samuelson, 2010
 Taophila nigrans Jolivet, Verma & Mille, 2007
 Taophila sagittarii Samuelson, 2010
 Taophila samuelsoni Platania & Gómez-Zurita, 2021
 Taophila scorpii Samuelson, 2010
 Taophila sideralis Platania & Gómez-Zurita, 2021
 Taophila subsericea Heller, 1916 (synonym: Taophila mandjeliae (Jolivet, Verma & Mille, 2010))
 Taophila taaluny Platania & Gómez-Zurita, 2021
 Taophila wanati Platania & Gómez-Zurita, 2021
 Subgenus Jolivetiana Gómez-Zurita & Cardoso, 2014
 Taophila mantillerii Jolivet, Verma & Mille, 2007

Species now in Tricholapita Gómez-Zurita & Cardoso, 2020 (formerly the subgenus Lapita Gómez-Zurita & Cardoso, 2014 nec Bickel, 2002):
 Taophila aphrodita Gómez-Zurita, 2014
 Taophila atlantis Platania & Gómez-Zurita, 2019
 Taophila gaea Gómez-Zurita, 2014
 Taophila hermes Platania & Gómez-Zurita, 2019
 Taophila kronos Platania & Gómez-Zurita, 2019
 Taophila mars Samuelson, 2010
 Taophila oceanica Platania & Gómez-Zurita, 2019
 Taophila olympica Platania & Gómez-Zurita, 2019
 Taophila ouranos Platania & Gómez-Zurita, 2019
 Taophila riberai Platania & Gómez-Zurita, 2019
 Taophila tridentata Platania & Gómez-Zurita, 2019

T. cancellata Samuelson, 2010 was transferred to Dematochroma.

References

Eumolpinae
Chrysomelidae genera
Insects of New Caledonia
Beetles of Oceania
Taxa named by Karl Borromaeus Maria Josef Heller
Endemic fauna of New Caledonia